The Transgender Gender-Variant & Intersex Justice Project (TGI Justice Project or TGIJP) is a San Francisco-based nonprofit organization working to end human rights abuses against transgender, intersex, and gender-variant people, particularly trans women of color in California prisons and detention centers. Originally led by Black trans activist Miss Major Griffin-Gracy and Asian American trans man and activist Alexander L. Lee (also the organization's founder), the current executive director of TGIJP is Janetta Johnson, a Black trans woman who was formerly incarcerated in a men's prison.

In 2016, TGIJP joined Black Lives Matter in withdrawing from the San Francisco Pride Parade, in protest of increased police presence at the event.

See also
LGBT people in prison
Transgender Law Center

References

External links

LGBT culture in San Francisco
Non-profit organizations based in San Francisco
Transgender organizations in the United States
Human rights organizations based in the United States
2004 establishments in California